Sarah Prieels (born 27 February 1990) is a Belgian archer competing the women's compound events. She won the gold medal in the mixed team event at the 2021 European Archery Championships held in Antalya, Turkey.

In June 2019, she competed in the women's individual compound event at the European Games held in Minsk, Belarus. In December 2019, she set a new world record for the women's 60-arrow 18-metre indoor ranking round with a total of 597 out of 600 points at the TRUBall/Axcel Roma Archery Trophy held in Rome, Italy.

She competed at the 2022 European Indoor Archery Championships held in Laško, Slovenia. She represented Belgium at the 2022 World Games held in Birmingham, United States.

Family 
She is the great-great-granddaughter of archer Hubert Van Innis, multiple olympic champion.

References

External links
 

Living people
1990 births
Place of birth missing (living people)
Belgian female archers
Universiade medalists in archery
Universiade bronze medalists for Belgium
Medalists at the 2015 Summer Universiade
Archers at the 2019 European Games
Competitors at the 2017 World Games
Competitors at the 2022 World Games
21st-century Belgian women